The narrownose smooth-hound (Mustelus schmitti) is a houndshark of the family Triakidae. It is found on the continental shelves of the subtropical southwest Atlantic, from southern Brazil to northern Argentina, between latitudes 30° S and 44° S, at depths between 60 m to 195 m. It can reach a length of 74 centimeters.

Narrownose smooth-hounds feed on crabs and probably other crustaceans, and presumably small fishes. Narrownose smooth-hounds are also caught and utilized for human consumption.

The reproduction of this houndshark is ovoviviparous, with 2 to 7 pups per litter, and a birth length of about 26 cm.

References
 
 

narrownose smooth-hound
Fish of Brazil
Southeastern South American coastal fauna
narrownose smooth-hound